Neck and Neck is a collaborative album by American guitarist Chet Atkins and British singer-songwriter and guitarist Mark Knopfler, released on October 9, 1990, by Columbia Records. "Poor Boy Blues" was released as a single.

At the 33rd Annual Grammy Awards in 1991, the track "Poor Boy Blues" won Best Country Vocal Collaboration, while the track "So Soft Your Goodbye" won Best Country Instrumental Performance.

Atkins originally recorded "Yakety Axe", a parody of Boots' Randolph's "Yakety Sax", on his 1965 album More of That Guitar Country. This new recording features lyrics and a new arrangement that were composed by Merle Travis. Atkins also previously recorded "I'll See You in My Dreams" on an album with Merle Travis.

The track "There'll Be Some Changes Made" was later included as track 10 of the 15-track 1996 Rolls-Royce Sound System Demonstration Disc and accompanying cassette.

Critical reception
In his review for AllMusic, Stephen Thomas Erlewine gave the album four out of five stars, calling it "the most focused and arguably the most rewarding record Atkins has released."  Erlewine singled out Knopfler's influence on the legendary guitarist:

Track listing

Personnel
Music
 Chet Atkins – guitar, vocals
 Mark Knopfler – guitar, vocals
 Larrie Londin – drums
 Guy Fletcher – drums, bass, keyboards
 Edgar Meyer – bass
 Steve Wariner – bass
 Mark O'Connor – fiddle, mandolin
 Paul Franklin – steel guitar, pedabro, dobro
 Floyd Cramer – piano (track 2)
 Vince Gill – backing vocals

Production
 Mark Knopfler – producer
 Mike Poston – engineer
 Guy Fletcher – engineer
 Vanelle – assistance engineer
 Ron Eve – assistance engineer
 Bill Schnee – mixing engineer
 Doug Sax – mastering at The Mastering Lab in Los Angeles
 Alan Yoshida – mastering at The Mastering Lab in Los Angeles
 Deborah Feingold – photography

Charts

Albums

Singles

References
Notes

Citations

External links
 Neck and Neck at Mark Knopfler official website
 "I'll See You in My Dreams"

1990 albums
Albums produced by Mark Knopfler
Chet Atkins albums
Columbia Records albums
Mark Knopfler albums
Collaborative albums